201 North Charles Street Building is a high-rise office building located at 201 North Charles Street in Baltimore, Maryland. The structure was completed in 1967, and is an example of international architecture.

See also
 List of tallest buildings in Baltimore

References

Downtown Baltimore
Skyscraper office buildings in Baltimore
Office buildings completed in 1967
International style architecture in Maryland